This list comprises all players who have participated in at least one league match for Charleston Battery since the establishment of the team in 1993. Players who were on the roster but never played a first team game are not listed; players who appeared for the team in other competitions (US Open Cup, CONCACAF Champions League, etc.) but never actually made an USL appearance are noted at the bottom of the page where appropriate.

A "†" denotes players who only appeared in a single match.

A
 Emmanuel Adjetey
 Brad Agoos
 Jon Akin
 Nelson Akwari
 Lazo Alavanja
 Chris Albrecht
 Osvaldo Alonso
 Byron Alvarez
 Daniel Alvarez
 Brian Alvero
 Edeh Ambrose†
 Alfredo Anderson
 Kevin Anderson
 Michael Anhaeuser
 Dan Antoniuk
 Craig Appelby
 Raúl Díaz Arce
 Stephen Armstrong
 Shaker Asad
 Jay Ayres
 Khalil Azmi

B
 Chris Bagley
 Seedy Bah
 John Ball
 Oumar Ballo
 David Banks
 Brian Bates
 Jamar Beasley
 Matt Behncke†
 Michael Behonick
 Glenn Benjamin†
 Ian Bennett
 Yeniel Bermudez
 Gabe Bernstein
 Álvaro Betancur
 Michael Behonick
 Brian Blair
 Matt Bobo
 Alvin Boisson
 Josh Bolton
 Eric Bossman
 Navion Boyd
 Clark Brisson
 Derick Brownell
 Chris Brunt
 Scott Buete

C
 Dan Calichman
 Josh Campbell
 Scott Cannon
 Chad Carithers
 Andrew Carleton
 Alex Caskey
 Juan Castillo
 Anthony Catalano
 Maikel Chang
 Gordon Chin
 Ted Chronopoulos
 Dominic Cianciarulo
 Michael Behonick
 Scott Clayton†
 Braeden Cloutier
 A.J. Cochrane
 Levi Coleman
 Paul Conway
 Judah Cooks
 Odisnel Cooper
 Kevin Corby
 Chris Corcoran
 Heviel Cordovés
 Mac Cozier
 Shane Crawford
 Brandon Curran

D
 Omar Daley
 Fred DeGand
 Davor Delic
 John Devereaux
 Chris Dias
 Linval Dixon
 Seamus Donnelly
 Christopher Dore
 Paul Dougherty
 Nick Downing
 Christopher Doyle
 Graham Dugoni
 Andrew Dykstra

E
 Gabe Eastman
 Jake Edwards
 Chris Errazuriz
 Justin Evans

F
 Colin Falvey
 Matt Farris
 Shawn Ferguson
 Marco Ferruzzi
 Willy Files
 Thomas Finlay
 Sean Flatley
 Jim Foley
 Jamie Franks
 Ian Fuller

G
 Mike Gailey
 Ricky Garbanzo
 Kenny Gasser†
 Jason Getz
 Gavin Glinton
 Jeremy Gold
 Chris Goos
 Christopher Gores
 Michael Green
 Quinton Griffith
 Jon Gruenewald
 Attaulah Guerra
 Alioune Gueye
 Jeremy Gunn
 Rivers Guthrie

H
 Neveal Hackshaw
 Chris Handsor
 Luc Harrington
 Wolde Harris
 Tom Heinemann
 Tyler Hemmings
 Josh Henderson
 Ezra Hendrickson
 Nigel Henry
 Todd Hoffard
 David Hoffman
 Ben Hollingsworth
 Jamie Holmes
 Bryan Hoy
 Dusty Hudock
 Jordan Hughes
 Lee Hurst

I
 Ivailo Ilarionov

J
 Kevin Jackson
 Vince Jajuga
 Nigel James
 Gilbert Jean-Baptiste
 Henrik Jensen
 John Jones
 Kelvin Jones

K
 Tim Karalexis
 Johnie Keene
 Josh Keller
 Dane Kelly
 Jonathon Kelly
 David Kenga
 Thabiso Khumalo
 Aaron King
 Ehren Kilian
 Steve Klein
 Andrew Kopp
 Aleksey Korol
 Steve Kraemer
 Wojtek Krakowiak
 Leonard Krupnik
 Ryan Kurtz
 Jason Kutney

L
 David Lara
 Forrest Lasso
 Billy Lesesne
 Troy Lesesne
 Andrew Lewis
 Peter Lewis
 Bernie Lilavois
 John Limniatis
 Rob Lindell
 Brian Loftin
 Mario Lone
 Alon Lubezky

M
 Dino Maamria
 J. C. Mack
 Dante Marini
 Nigel Marples
 Jesus Martinez-Morales
 Brandon Massie
 Jeffrey Matteo
 Rudolph Mayard
 Chris McClellan
 Craig McCully
 Ivan McKinley
 Teba McKnight
 Mike Mekelburg
 Tim Melia
 Wade Meyers
 Rashad Miller
 Todd Miller
 John Mills
 David Minihan
 Barry Moore
 Lester Moré
 Taylor Mueller

N
 Lamar Neagle
 Guy Norcott
 Caleb Norkus
 Amaury Nunes
 Kevin Nylen

O
 Kevin O'Brien
 Ugochukwu Okoye
 Patrick Olalere
 Bo Oshoniyi

P
 Keith Parkinson
 Ben Parry
 Nicki Paterson
 Randi Patterson
 Jonathon Payne
 Clint Peay
 Mike Peckich†
 Andres Perez-Matto
 Cole Peverley
 Terry Phelan
 Colin Phillips
 Reggie Pierre-Jerome
 Brian Piesner
 Jeremie Piette
 Eddie Pigford
 Ivan Polic
 Garth Pollonais
 Justin Portillo
 Jamie Posnanski
 Zach Prince

R
 Jukka Rantala
 Marco Reda
 Kyle Reynish
 Mike Richardson
 Damon Richvalsky
 Colin Rocke
 Edmundo Rodriguez
 Memo Rodriuguez
 Louie Rolko
 Armando Romero
 Jose Romero-Coreas
 Robert Rosario
 Andrew Rosenband
 Warren Russ

S
 Tim Sahaydak
 Shea Salinas†
 Manny Sanchez
 Brent Sancho
 Lee Sandwina
 Frankie Sanfilippo
 Amadou Sanyang
 Austin Savage
 Darren Sawatzky
 Andy Schmetzer
 Eric Schmitt
 Kevin Scott
 Blair Scoullar
 Justin Sells
 Dean Sewell
 Matthew Sheldon
 Toni Siikala
 Gregory Simmonds
 Gregory Smith
 Josh Smith
 Lawrence Smith
 Darren Spicer
 Nicky Spooner
 Terry St. Louis
 Morry Steinbach
 Temoc Suarez
 Kyle Swords

T
 Alexandros Tabakis
 Patrick Tate†
 Brian Taylor
 Evan Taylor
 Jeff Terry†
 Scott Thelen
 Sébastien Thurière
 Rick Titus
 Michael Todd
 Pearse Tormey
 Andre Toussaint
 Kenji Treschuk
 Ryan Trout
 Chris Tsonis
 Corey Turnage
 David Turner†
 Ryan Turner

U
 Kenny Uzoigwe

V
 Gabriel Valencia-Jimenez
 Jarad van Schaik
 Rob Vartughian†
 Usiel Vazquez-Garcia
 Tim Velten
 Luke Vercollone
 Chris Veselka

W
 Gerard Walker
 Ryan Walker†
 Diego Walsh
 Darren Warham *
 Jamie Watson†
 Mark Watson
 Pablo Webster
 Shane Weems
 Keith Wiggans
 Chris Williams
 Rob Williams
 Romario Williams
 John Wilson
 Mark Wiltse
 Stephen Winters
 O'Brian Woodbine
 Alex Woods

Y
 Tsuyoshi Yoshitake
 Velko Yotov
 Paul Young

Z
 Mike Zaher
 Morgan Zeba

Other competition
 Chris Riley - Played one game in the 1995 Carolina Challenge Cup.

Sources

Charleston Battery
 
Association football player non-biographical articles